United Nations Security Council resolution 577, adopted unanimously on 6 December 1985, after reaffirming Resolution 571 (1985), the Council endorsed a report by the Security Council Commission of Investigation, condemning the regime in South Africa for its continued and unprovoked attacks against the People's Republic of Angola through the occupied territory of South West Africa.

The resolution demanded South Africa withdraw its troops from Angolan territory and to respect the sovereignty of Angola. The Council reaffirmed the right of Angola to claim compensation for the attacks due to the loss of life and damage to property. It also, once again, urgently requested Member States and international organisations assist in the reconstruction of economic infrastructure in Angola.

Finally, the Council required the Secretary-General to submit a report on the implementation of the current resolution no later than 30 June 1986.

See also
 Angola – South Africa relations
 List of United Nations Security Council Resolutions 501 to 600 (1982–1987)
 Namibian War of Independence
 South African Border Wars
 South Africa under apartheid

References
Text of the Resolution at undocs.org

External links
 

 0577
20th century in South Africa
1985 in South Africa
1985 in Africa
1985 in Angola
 0577
Angola–South Africa relations
December 1985 events